The Chapel of the Milk Grotto of Our Lady also called Grotto of Our Lady or Milk Grotto, is a Catholic chapel in Bethlehem, in the West Bank of the State of Palestine, erected in 1872. Since Byzantine times, the place has been a center of Christian pilgrimage, maintained since its last erection together with its Marian shrine and monastery by the Custody of the Holy Land of the Order of the Friars Minor of the Catholic Church in Palestine. The Status Quo, a 250-year-old understanding between religious communities, applies to the site.

History
The current Catholic chapel was built in 1872 on the site of a former Byzantine church from around the 5th century, of which only part of the mosaic floor remains.

Significance
Christian tradition says is the place where the Holy Family found refuge during the Massacre of the Innocents, before they could flee to Egypt. The name is derived from the story that a "drop of milk" of the Virgin Mary fell on the floor of the cave and changed its colour to white.

The space, which contains three different caves, is visited by some in hope of healing infertile couples, the shrine allegedly being a place where prayers for children are miraculously answered.

Monastery of the Perpetual Adoration of the Blessed Sacrament
A monastery of the Sisters of Perpetual Adoration of the Blessed Sacrament is attached to the chapel. The red-and-white clad nuns practice perpetual Eucharistic adoration, and are also uninterruptedly praying for peace since 2016, when a 'Queen of Peace' tabernacle was installed in their Eucharistic Adoration Chapel.

The tabernacle was donated by the Polish community 'Queen of Peace' to the Franciscan Custody of the Holy Land. It was originally designed for the Fourth Station of the Via Dolorosa in Jerusalem, but was eventually moved to the Sisters of Perpetual Adoration at the Milk Grotto in 2016, because they were better prepared to ensure the continuous prayer for peace.

The Polish artist who designed the tabernacle, Mariusz Drapikowski, explains his work as inspired by the Apocalypse of St John: the closed tabernacle depicts earthly Jerusalem, with the twelve Apostles and the twelve Tribes of Israel surrounding the image of Jesus on the cross, while the open shrine is representing the heavenly Jerusalem, brightly shining and flanked by a pair of olive trees which symbolise the two witnesses of the Apocalipse. Their branches are filled with a variety of different crosses, symbolising the various Christian professions emerging from the common trunk of Christianity. At the centre of the open shrine stands the monstrance showing a Madonna holding in her hands the Eucharistic Christ, depicted as a large host.

See also
Church of St. Catherine, Bethlehem
Shepherd's Field Chapel, Bethlehem

References

External links
 Bethlehem municipality website
Photos of the Chapel of the Milk Grotto at the Manar al-Athar photo archive

Roman Catholic churches in Bethlehem
Roman Catholic churches completed in 1872
Roman Catholic chapels in the State of Palestine
Status quo holy places
Massacre of the Innocents
19th-century Roman Catholic church buildings